Jainism, unlike the closely related Buddhism, is a minority religion in Japan. At present, there are three Jain temples in Japan, with the Kobe Jain temple being the most famous one. Jainism is growing in Japan, more than 5,000 ethnic Japanese families in Japan have converted to Jainism.

History
Forty Japanese students were sponsored by the Government of India in the early 1950s to live and study in India. Some of them studied Navinaya in Varanasi and Gujarat, which led to new interest in the study of Jainism in Japan. One of the accomplishments was the first Japanese book by Minakata Kumagusu to simplify and translate the concepts of Jainism into Japanese for use by the common people in Japan.

See also

 Jainism in Canada
 Jainism in Europe
 Jainism in Hong Kong
 Jainism in Singapore
 Jainism in the United States

References

Citation

Source

Further reading
 A Japanese take on Jainism (in English)- kamit.jp

Japan
Religion in Japan
Jain communities
Japan